Grant R. F. McAuley (born 6 July 1949) is a New Zealand rower.

McAuley was born in 1949 in Auckland, New Zealand. He rowed with the coxed eight in the 1975 World Rowing Championships in Nottingham, Great Britain, and won a bronze medal. He represented New Zealand at the 1976 Summer Olympics in the coxless four in a team with Bob Murphy, David Lindstrom, and Des Lock, narrowly beaten by the team from the Soviet Union to fourth place. He is listed as New Zealand Olympian athlete number 358 by the New Zealand Olympic Committee. He competed in the 1978 World Rowing Championships in the double sculls with John White and they came sixth in the final. At the 1979 World Rowing Championships held at Bled in Slovenia, Yugoslavia, he won a silver medal with the coxed eight. McAuley won the Bay of Plenty Sportsman of the Year award in 1979.

References

1949 births
Living people
New Zealand male rowers
Rowers at the 1976 Summer Olympics
Olympic rowers of New Zealand
Rowers from Auckland
World Rowing Championships medalists for New Zealand